The term Perfect Master may refer to:
the 5th of 33 degrees in Scottish Rite Freemasonry  (French: Maître Parfait) 
a title of Jesus in  The Church of Jesus Christ of Latter-day Saints.
a translation of Satguru in  Hindu movements and Sant Mat
a term used in the Divine Light Mission (DLM)
a term used by Meher Baba. See Perfect Master (Meher Baba)
George Frayne also known as Commander Cody, was introduced at performances of Commander Cody and His Lost Planet Airmen as "the 29-year old Perfect Master himself, Commander Cody".